William Evelyn was Dean of Emly  from 1875 until his death in March 1776.

References

Irish Anglicans
Alumni of Trinity College, Cambridge
Deans of Emly
1818 deaths
Year of birth unknown